Marasmius amazonicus is a species of agaric fungus in the family Marasmiaceae. Described as new to science in 1904 by mycologist Paul Christoph Hennings, it is found in South America.

See also
List of Marasmius species

References

External links

amazonicus
Fungi described in 1904
Fungi of South America
Taxa named by Paul Christoph Hennings